Bruce Robertson (born 17 June 1962) is a Canadian competition rower and Olympic champion.

Robertson won a gold medal in coxed eights at the 1992 Summer Olympics in Barcelona, as a member of the Canadian team. He also competed in coxless fours at the 1988 Summer Olympics in Seoul, where he finished 11th.

References

1962 births
Canadian male rowers
Olympic rowers of Canada
Rowers at the 1992 Summer Olympics
Olympic gold medalists for Canada
Sportspeople from Alberta
Living people
Olympic medalists in rowing
Medalists at the 1992 Summer Olympics
Rowers at the 1988 Summer Olympics
Pan American Games medalists in rowing
Pan American Games bronze medalists for Canada
Rowers at the 1987 Pan American Games
Medalists at the 1987 Pan American Games